The 2014–15 Cincinnati Bearcats women's basketball team will represent the University of Cincinnati during the 2014–15 NCAA Division I women's basketball season. The season marks the second for the Bearcats as members of the American Athletic Conference. The team, coached by head coach Jamelle Elliott in her sixth year, plays their home games at Fifth Third Arena. They finished the season 8–23, 4–14 in AAC play to finish in ninth place. They advanced to the quarter-finals of the Athletic Conference women's tournament where they lost to Connecticut.

Media
All Bearscats games will have an audio broadcast streamed on Bearcats TV. Before conference season home games will also have a video stream on Bearcats TV. Conference home games will rotate between ESPN3, AAC Digital, Fox Sports Ohio, and Bearcats TV. Road games will typically be streamed on the opponents website, though conference road games could also appear on ESPN3 or AAC Digital.

2014–15 Roster

Schedule and results

|-
!colspan=12 style="background:#002868; color:#FFFFFF;"|Exhibition

|-
!colspan=12 style="background:#DC143C; color:#FFFFFF;"|Regular Season

|-
!colspan=12 style="background:#000000;"| 2015 AAC Tournament

See also
2014–15 Cincinnati Bearcats men's basketball team
Cincinnati Bearcats women's basketball

References

External links
Official website

Cincinnati
Cincinnati Bearcats women's basketball seasons